Argyris Theodoropoulos (born 13 January 1981) is a Greek water polo player who competed in the 2004 Summer Olympics, in the 2008 Summer Olympics and in the 2012 Summer Olympics.

See also
 List of World Aquatics Championships medalists in water polo

References

External links
 

1981 births
Living people
Greek male water polo players
Olympiacos Water Polo Club players
Olympic water polo players of Greece
Water polo players at the 2004 Summer Olympics
Water polo players at the 2008 Summer Olympics
Water polo players at the 2012 Summer Olympics
World Aquatics Championships medalists in water polo
Water polo players from Athens